Bernard Michael "Benny" Gaughran (29 September 1915 – 20 September 1977) was an Irish soccer player during the 1930s. Gaughran won the League of Ireland title with Bohemians in 1935–36. His Bohemian teammates included Harry Cannon, Plev Ellis, Fred Horlacher and Billy Jordan that season, and Gaughran was top scorer with 15 goals in 21 league games. In his 39 appearances that season in all competitions, he netted 32 times. In 1936, Gaughran was part of the team who broke a record by winning the fifth league title of the free State League Championship by defeating Cork 4–1, and Gaughran scored the third and fourth goals of the game.

Gaughran later went on to play professionally for Celtic, Southampton, Sunderland, Rochdale and Dundalk.

Playing career

Early career

When Gaughran was young, he played Gaelic football for St. Laurence O'Tooles and subsequently took up rugby with O'Connell Schools, where he had great possibilities as a full back. Gaughran's main sport was rugby until 18 years of age when he played his first game of Association Football. While with O'Connell Schools he played for Leinster against Connacht in a schools' junior interprovincial. He later joined Clontarf, where he played a few games for them.

Charlie Harris, the Bohemians' trainer succeeded in inducing him to take up Association Football. Gaughran believed that his rugby training gave him a good grounding for soccer and that "if one could kick an oval ball accurately there should be no great difficulty in learning how to control a round one." After a few games with Bohemians' Leinster League team he made his debut for their Free State team against Waterford at Kilcohan Park and very soon attracted the attention of a number of cross-channel clubs. Arsenal were very keen to sign him towards the close of the 1935–36 season and sent their chief scout to sign him but they were unsuccessful.

Bohemians was not his first soccer club, as he played 6 matches for a junior team in the Phoenix Park, scoring 36 goals for them.

Interest from UK clubs
At the start of the 1936–37 season, there was interest in Gaughran from several UK football clubs, including Arsenal, Wolverhampton Wanderers, Burnley, Blackburn Rovers and Manchester United. Scouts from Manchester United came over to vet Gaughran, were satisfied and made arrangements to sign him, with Louis Rocca, United's Chief Scout, travelling over to Bray in November 1936 to complete the deal. Rocca was disappointed to arrive to Dublin to discover that Glasgow Celtic's representative, Johnny Paton, had stepped in and topped United's offer and brought Benny Gaughran to Glasgow after tentative terms were agreed on. In fact, Celtic were watching Gaughran's progress for 13 months and when news began to filter through of other clubs' interest, Celtic acted promptly.

Celtic, Southampton, Sunderland, Rochdale and Dundalk

He joined Celtic in November 1936 as a centre-forward at 20 years of age. In June 1937, he moved to England to join Southampton, where he stayed for five months before joining Sunderland in November. After six months he moved on to join Rochdale and then returned to Ireland in 1939 to join Dundalk. At Southampton, Gaughran had seven league appearances and four goals, giving him an average strike rate of one goal every 1.75 games

Personal life

Education and work outside of sports
When he started his football career, he was a salesman. Later on in life, in the 1960s and 1970s, he worked as a beekeeper.

Family
Bernard Gaughran was married with three children, two boys and a girl - Benny, Ken & Laraine. His father, Bernard, was a well known hurler for Meath. His brother Charlie played Gaelic football for Dublin and his brother John had a Gaelic football, rugby and soccer career. His son, Benny Gaughran, was a Gaelic footballer and won an All-Ireland Club medal with UCD (Dublin), three Dublin Championship club medals (one with UCD and two with Civil Service), an inter-county National League medal (with Louth), an inter-Provincial Railway Cup medal (Leinster) and a Sigerson’s medal (as captain).

Honours
Bohemians
 League of Ireland champions: 1935–36

References

External links
Sunderland profile

1915 births
Association footballers from County Dublin
1977 deaths
League of Ireland players
Bohemian F.C. players
Celtic F.C. players
Southampton F.C. players
Sunderland A.F.C. players
Rochdale A.F.C. players
Dundalk F.C. players
Association football forwards
Republic of Ireland association footballers